Ernest Samuels (May 19, 1903 in Chicago, Illinois – February 12, 1996 in Evanston, Illinois) was an American biographer and lawyer.

Life 
Born in Chicago, he received his Ph.B. in 1923 and J.D. in 1926 from the University of Chicago. He moved to the southwest to recover from tuberculosis, staying in that part of the country and practicing law in El Paso, Texas. He then moved back to Chicago, switching to literature and earning an M.A. in English from the University of Chicago in 1931.  During the Depression years 1931-1937 he practiced law in Chicago and taught business English at Bryant & Stratton Business College, for which he wrote a textbook.  From 1937 to 1939 he was an English instructor at the State College of Washington, now Washington State University, where he met and married Jayne Newcomer. In 1942 he completed a Ph.D. in English at the University of Chicago with a dissertation on "The Early Career of Henry Adams." He then began teaching English at Northwestern University, serving as department chair from 1964 to 1966. With the exception of a visiting professorship at the University of Southern California in 1966-67, he remained at Northwestern for his entire teaching career.

After retiring from Northwestern in 1971, Samuels concentrated exclusively on his writing. He is best known for his 3-volume biography of Henry Adams (1948, 1958, 1964), for which he received the Parkman Prize, the Bancroft Prize, and the 1965 Pulitzer Prize for Biography or Autobiography, and he was a principal editor of the six-volume collection of the letters of Henry Adams (1982, 1988). He also wrote a two-volume biography of Bernard Berenson (1979, 1987), which is considered "the most authoritative and comprehensive" study of its subject. The first volume was a finalist for a National Book Award. His wife, Jayne Newcomer Samuels, assisted with most of his publications. After they spent a year together at I Tatti, researching the Berenson archives, she co-edited Mary Berenson: A Self-Portrait from Her Diaries and Letters with Barbara Strachey, Mary Berenson's granddaughter, (1980).

Both Ernest and Jayne Samuels died in Evanston, Illinois, Ernest in 1996 and Jayne in 2013.

Works
 Samuels, Ernest, The Young Henry Adams (Harvard University Press, 1948)
 Samuels, Ernest, Henry Adams: The Middle Years (Harvard University Press, 1958)
 Samuels, Ernest, Henry Adams: The Major Phase (Harvard University Press, 1964)
 Samuels, Ernest, Henry Adams (Harvard University Press, 1989) (Abridgement of three above biographies)
 Samuels, Ernest, Bernard Berenson: The Making of a Connoisseur (Harvard University Press, 1979)
 Samuels, Ernest, Bernard Berenson: The Making of a Legend (Harvard University Press, 1987)
 Adams, Henry, The Letters of Henry Adams (6 vols.) (Belknap Press, 1982, 1988) (eds.: J.C. Levenson, Ernest Samuels, Charles Vandersee, Viola Winner)
 Adams, Henry, Henry Adams: Selected Letters (Harvard University Press, 1992) (ed. Ernest Samuels) 
 Bittner, David Professor Ernest Samuels: Pioneering Jewish Educator who "Broke the Back" of Academic Elitism (Western States Jewish History, Fall 2013, Vol. 46 Issue 1)

References

Sources
Journal of the Massachusetts Historical Society

External links
Ernest Samuels Papers, Northwestern University Archives, Evanston, Illinois

 
 

1903 births
Pulitzer Prize for Biography or Autobiography winners
Bancroft Prize winners
20th-century American biographers
Jewish American writers
Writers from Chicago
1996 deaths
20th-century American non-fiction writers
20th-century American Jews
University of Chicago alumni